Gombe (Fula: Gelle/Wuro Gombe 𞤺𞤫𞥅𞤤𞥆𞤫/𞤱𞤵𞥅𞤪𞤮 𞤺𞤮𞤥𞤥𞤦𞤫) is the capital city of Gombe State, north-eastern Nigeria, with an estimated population of 261,536. The city is the headquarters of Gombe State, a traditional city that covers most of Gombe State.  The major spoken languages in Gombe are Hausa and Fulfulɗe, Tera and Tangale. Recent development in the state includes the establishment of new International Conference Center, Gombe under  the administration of the former Governor of the state, Ibrahim Hassan Dan-kwambo and inaugurated by the president of Nigeria, ably represented by his vice, Prof. Yemi Osinbajo on 27th of may 2019, opening of the new Gombe Lawanti International Airport  in 2008 and state-wide street solar installation.

Population
Gombe State is populated by the Fulani people, constituting more than half of the state's population. Other ethnic groups include the Bolewa, Tera, Waja, and Hausa people.

The LGA has an area of 52 km² and a population of 480,000 at the 2006 census.

The postal code of the area is 760.

Politics
The current Local Government Chairman is Alh Ali Ashaka.

Transport
Gombe is served by Gombe Lawanti International Airport, and by a station on the eastern mainline of the national railway network and Gombe Line Terminal in mid-city. On 1 Feb., President Goodluck Jonathan announced that the Gombe-Kafancha-Kaduna intercity train services had been "rehabilitated", saying "the inauguration of the train services was crucial to the growth and development of the Gombe and other adjoining states." "Minister of Transport, Idris Umar ... flagged off the Gombe-Kafanchan-Port Harcourt and Gombe-Kafanchan-Kaduna intercity train services."

Culture and education 
Gombe, as Gombe State capital, is the home of the notable Gombe State University (GSU) located at Shamaki ward, Tudun Wada, Gombe. The University was established during the then government of Governor Danjuma Goje in 2004. Making it the first University in the State. Also, in Gombe is Federal College of Education (Technical), Gombe. Also, in Gombe, is the College of Nursing and midwifery Gombe state, also, another State managed tertiary institution and is located at JEKADAFARI. Also, in Gombe is the College of Medical Sciences. There are also several State and private-owned primary and Secondary schools within Gombe, among are MATRIX International Academy, Gombe Central, Government Science Secondary School, Government Day Secondary School (Pilot), Pen resource Academy, to mention but few.

Economy 
Farming is the main source of income for the inhabitants of Gombe State. Maize, millet, Guinea corn, rice, cotton, groundnut, beans, Beni seed, and other food and cash crops are farmed in the state. Livestock rearing is also common in the state. Tudun Hatsi is a notable market where grain business thrives in Gombe local government. The market generates huge revenue to the local government and the state in general. 

The Gombe Urban Market, also known as (Babbar kasuwa) in Hausa, is located in the HERWAGANA region of Gombe. The state's geographical location and friendly economy make it a commercial area where entrepreneurs, even neighboring states, have their SMEs established. These SMEs have been the source of employment and income generation to many individuals

Gombe town's unusual location in the heart of the North-East has made it a popular resting and gathering spot for travelers and traders from all over the geopolitical zone and beyond.

In 2008 an agreement was reached "to set up anti-venom manufacturing plant in Kaltungo General Hospital in Gombe," and provide medical training for snakebite patients. The Gombe State government ordered an additional N4 million in anti-venom for the hospital in 2009, due to a local increase in snakebites.

Sports 

Gombe is also home to the new Pantami Stadium, a 12000-capacity sporting complex erected in 2010 by the then-Governor Danjuma Goje's administration to help the state's sports growth. It replaced the earlier Abubakar Umar Memorial Stadium and is home to Gombe United F.C. and Gombe Bulls, the 2017 Nigerian Premier League runners-up (basketball).

Boko Haram 
Gombe has been impacted by jihadist group Boko Haram's insurgency, having been attacked several times in the mid-2010s.

On 22 December 2014, a suicide bombing at a bus station killed over 20 people.

On 1 January 2015, a suicide bomber attacked a New Year's Eve service at a church, injuring several people. On 14 January 2015, a suicide bomber killed two people and left 14 wounded at a Gombe mosque.

On 2 February 2015, just minutes after a campaign rally by President Goodluck Johnathan, an attack by a female suicide bomber left one person dead and eighteen injured. Two blasts had occurred in the city the previous day, leaving five people dead. Local residents "have set up checkpoints to defend Gombe" according to the BBC.

Boko Haram attacked Gombe on 14 February 2015, as well as on 16 and 22 July 2015.

See also
 Gombe State University
 Railway stations in Nigeria
List of governors of Gombe State

References

Local Government Areas in Gombe State
State capitals in Nigeria